The Suwannee County, Florida paleontological sites are assemblages of Early Miocene invertebrates and vertebrates occurring in Suwannee County, Florida.

Age
Era: Neogene
Period: Early Miocene

Sites
S1BA site aka Live Oak site. AEO: ~21.8—21.7 Mya., approximately 
Coordinates:

Specimens

Mammals
Anchitheriinae (horse)
Arikarictis chapini (mustelid)
Daphoenodon (bear-dog)
Leptocyon (canine)
Eomyidae (gopher)
Geomyoidea (pocket gopher)
Herpetotherium (pygmy opossum)
Harrymys magnus
Mammacyon obtusidens (bear-dog)
Megalictis frazieri (mustelid)
Nothokemas waldropi (camel)
Palaeogale minuta (catlike carnivore)
Phlaocyon leucosteus
Protosciurus (tree squirrel)
Vespertilionidae (bat)

References

Paleobiology Database, Collection 17837, authorized by John Alroy, Ph.D., National Center for Ecological Analysis and Synthesis, University of California, Santa Barbara
Alroy, J., Conjunction among taxonomic distributions and the Miocene mammalian biochronology of the Great Plains. Paleobiology 18(3):326-343, 1992.
Alroy, J., 2008. Speciation and extinction in the fossil record of North American mammals. Ecological Reviews, 2008.
Hayes, F. G., The Brooksville 2 local fauna (Arikareean, latest Oligocene) Hernando County, Florida. Bulletin of the Florida Museum of Natural History 43(1):1-47. 2000.

Paleontological sites of Florida
Natural history of Florida
Geography of Suwannee County, Florida